VNP and RC Marg Junction is a monorail station on Line 1 of the Mumbai Monorail. It was opened to the public on 2 February 2014, as part of the first phase of Line 1. It is located at the Busy Chembur Naka, which will in future also serve connectivity to Yellow line of Mumbai Metro.

References

Mumbai Monorail stations
Railway stations in India opened in 2014